Conor O'Shea (born 1993) is an Irish hurler who plays as a right wing-back for the Kilkenny senior team.

Born in Clara, County Kilkenny, O'Shea first played competitive hurling during his schooling at St. Kieran's College, winning back-to-back All-Ireland medals with the college in 2010 and 2011. He later came to prominence with the Clara club at underage levels before joining the intermediate team. An All-Ireland medal winner in this grade in 2013, O'Shea later won two county senior championship medals.

O'Shea made his debut on the inter-county scene at the age of sixteen when he first played for the Kilkenny minor team. He was an All-Ireland and Leinster medal winner in this grade in 2010. O'Shea joined the Kilkenny senior team in 2015 as a member of the extended panel.

References

1993 births
Living people
Clara hurlers
Kilkenny inter-county hurlers